The sixth season of the Canadian reality competition show Top Chef Canada was broadcast on Food Network in Canada. It is the Canadian spin-off of Bravo's hit show Top Chef. The program takes place in Toronto, and is hosted by Eden Grinshpan.  Season six features 11 young chefs considered to be the next generation of culinary stars.

Contestants
11 chefs competed in season 6. Contestants are listed in the order they were eliminated.
Felix Zhou, 29, Coquitlam, BC
Ivana Raca, 33, Toronto, ON
Elia Herrera, 37, Toronto, ON
Jesse Zuber, 29, Saskatoon, SK
Matt Sullivan, 34, Toronto, ON
Darren Rogers, 27, Montreal, QC
Nathan Guggenheimer, 35, Saskatoon, SK
Jean-Phillipe "JP" Miron, 30, Montreal, QC
Jinhee Lee, 38, Calgary, AB
Mark Singson, 29, Vancouver, BC
Ross Larkin, 31, St. John's, NL

Contestant Progress 

 The winner received immunity, which could be used at any time in the next four rounds.
 Ross used his immunity to save himself and Mark from elimination
 Nathan and Felix were brought back in the fourth episode; because the team with Nathan won the challenge, he was able to stay in the competition
 Feeling dissatisfied with his level of cooking throughout the competition and struggling mentally, Nathan withdrew from the competition

 (WINNER) The chef won the season and was crowned Top Chef.
 (RUNNER-UP) The chef was a runner-up for the season.
 (WIN) The chef won that episode's Elimination Challenge.
 (HIGH) The chef was selected as one of the top entries in the Elimination Challenge, but did not win.
 (LOW) The chef was selected as one of the bottom entries in the Elimination Challenge, but was not eliminated.
 (OUT) The chef lost that week's Elimination Challenge and was out of the competition.
 (IN) The chef neither won nor lost that week's Elimination Challenge. They also were not up to be eliminated.
 (WITHDREW) The chef withdrew from the competition.

Episodes

References

Canada, Season 6
2018 Canadian television seasons